Lekeleka is an island in Lulunga district, in the Haʻapai islands of Tonga.

References

Islands of Tonga
Haʻapai